Gir Gadhada Taluka is a taluka of Gir Somnath district in the state of Gujarat, India. Before 2013 the area was part of Una Taluka, but it became a taluka in its own right with the creation of Gir Somnath District in August of that year. Gir Gadhada Taluka has population around 15,600. The village of Gir Gadhada became its administrative headquarters.

Villages
Revenue records list forty-two villages for Gir Gadhada Taluka.

Ambavad
Ankolali
Babariya
Bediya
Bhakha
Bhiyal
Bodidar
Dhokadva
Dhrabavad
Dron
Fareda
Fatsar
Fulka
Gir Gadhada
Harmadiya
JASHADHAR GIR
Itvaya
Jamvala
Jaragli
Jhanjhariya
Jhudvadli
Juna Ugla
Kanakiya
Kaneri
Kansariya
Khilavad
Kodiya
Mahobatpara
Motisar
Nagadiya
Nava Ugla
Nitli
Panderi
Rasulpara
Sanosri
Sanvav
Sonariya
Sonpura
Thordi
Umedpara
Undari
Vadli
Vadviyala
Velakot

Tourist Places Near By Gir Gadhada

How to reach Gir Gadhada

By Train

Gir Gadhara Rail Way Station. 
Distance from 
 Somnath to Girgadhada: 76 km
 Junagadh to Girgadhada: 110 km
 Rajkot to Girgadhada: 171 km

By Bus
 Junagadh to Girgadhada: 119 km
 Diu to Girgadhada: 37 km
 Una to Girgadhada: 18 km
 Veraval to Girgadhada: 78 km
 Talala to Girgadhada: 78 km
 Kodinar to Girgadhada: 45 km

Available Network Service Provider
 Idea (3G)
 Airtel
 Bsnl
 Vodafone
 Videocon
 Uninor
 Tata Docomo
 Tata Indicom
 Virgin Mobile
Jio (4g)

References

Talukas of Gujarat
Cities and towns in Gir Somnath district